Rhinogobius wuyanlingensis is a freshwater goby native to Wuyanling National Nature Reserve in Zhejiang Province, China. It is probably endemic to the upper reaches of the Feiyun River Basin.

Rhinogobius wuyanlingensis measure  in standard length.

References

wuyanlingensis
Freshwater fish of China
Endemic fauna of Zhejiang
Fish described in 2008
Taxa named by Wu Han-Lin
Taxa named by Chen I-Shiung